During the 1971–72 English football season, Leicester City F.C. competed in the Football League First Division.

Season summary
In the 1971–72 season, Jimmy Bloomfield was appointed as new Leicester boss for the new season, and kept them in the First Division in their first season back in the top flight after a 2-year absence with a satisfying 12th-place finish. Unusually, due to Division One champions Arsenal's commitments in European competition, Division Two winners Leicester were invited to play FA Cup winners Liverpool in the Charity Shield, winning it for the first time, by 1-0.

Final league table

Results
Leicester City's score comes first

Legend

Football League First Division

FA Cup

League Cup

FA Charity Shield

Anglo-Italian Cup

Squad

References

Leicester City F.C. seasons
Leicester City